The  brought many of Japan's private railway lines under national control. The 22nd Diet of Japan passed the bill on March 27, 1906 and Emperor Meiji signed on March 30, 1906. The promulgation of the act on the Official Gazette occurred the next day. The Act was repealed by Article 110 of the Act for Enforcement of Japanese National Railways Reform Act Etc. (Act No. 93 of 1986).

The original bill which passed the House of Representatives on March 16, 1906 listed 32 private railways to be nationalized, but the House of Peers amended the bill removing 15 companies from the list on March 27, 1906 and the House of Representatives accepted this amendment the same day.

Between 1906 and 1907,  of track were purchased from 17 private railway companies.

See also
Railway Construction Act
Railway nationalization
Japanese Government Railways

References

Japanese legislation
1906 in law
Empire of Japan
Rail transport in Japan
1906 in Japan
Nationalization
Railway legislation
History of rail transport in Japan
1906 in rail transport